English singer Charli XCX has written tracks on her five studio albums, four mixtapes, three extended plays, and has written songs for other singers. She started her career with her self-written and produced small-distribution debut 14 in 2008. Charli XCX had her big break through Swedish duo Icona Pop's single, "I Love It", as the vocalist and co-songwriter.

Charli XCX released her debut studio album, True Romance in 2013, followed by Sucker a year later. In 2016, Charli XCX released her second extended play, Vroom Vroom. She released two mixtapes in 2017, Number 1 Angel and Pop 2, the latter received universal acclaim from music critics, ranked fortieth by Pitchfork in the list of "The 200 Best Albums of the 2010s".

Charli XCX began working on her third studio album from 2015 to 2017. The initial third studio album was delayed multiple times before ultimately leaking in August 2017, causing its release to be cancelled. The album would initially include singles "After the Afterparty" and "Boys". Charli XCX then worked on a new project, eventually released as her third studio album Charli in 2019. She then worked on and released her fourth studio album, How I'm Feeling Now, during the COVID-19 lockdown. Charli XCX released her fifth studio album, titled Crash on 18 March 2022, her last album to be released under her current record contract with Atlantic Records.

Some artists applauded Charli XCX for her songwriting skills, including Olivia Rodrigo, Izzy Camina, Girli, and Lolo Zouaï. Apart from her own music, Charli XCX also wrote for other artists, including Blondie, will.i.am, Selena Gomez, Iggy Azalea, and Camila Cabello.

Songs

Notes

References

XCX, Charli